The 2017 Nobel Prize in Literature was awarded to the British novelist Kazuo Ishiguro (born 1954) "who, in novels of great emotional force, has uncovered the abyss beneath our illusory sense of connection with the world." The prize was announced by the Swedish Academy on 5 October 2017. 

Ishiguro is the 12th English writer to become a Nobel laureate in Literature after 2008 laureate Doris Lessing. He was succeeded later by novelist Abdulrazak Gurnah, who became a Nobel laureate in 2021.

Laureate

Memory, time and lifelong deception are central themes in Kazuo Ishiguro’s works. Growing up in a Japanese family in Great Britain has colored his thinking and perspectives. His first two novels are set in Japan – A Pale View of Hills (1982) and An Artist of the Floating World (1986). His most celebrated work, The Remains of the Day (1989), is about an English butler and his feelings for a housekeeper at the time around World War II. In later works, Ishiguro approached genres such as fantasy and science fiction as in Never Let Me Go (2005) and Klara and the Sun (2021). His language is characterized by restraint, even when dramatic events are portrayed. He is the father of British short story writer, Naomi Ishiguro.

Reactions
The choice of Kazuo Ishiguro as the Nobel Prize Laureate was generally well received. Salman Rushdie said “Many congratulations to my old friend Ish, whose work I’ve loved and admired ever since I first read A Pale View of Hills". Former UK Poet Laureate Andrew Motion said "by resting his stories on founding principles which combine a very fastidious kind of reserve with equally vivid indications of emotional intensity. It’s a remarkable and fascinating combination, and wonderful to see it recognised by the Nobel prize-givers.” Kazuo Ishiguro himself said:

Award ceremony speech
In her award ceremony speech on 10 December 2017  Sara Danius, permanent secretary of the Swedish Academy, said of Ishiguro: "An Ishiguro story is like a mix of Jane Austen and Franz Kafka. This may sound odd. Strictly speaking, it should be impossible. But Ishiguro shows that it works. It works well indeed. Herein lies much of his greatness. On the one hand, there is depiction of the ordinary, the enforced protocols of social life, the irrevocable ironies of human existence. On the other hand, an awareness of the absurdly comical, like Kafka’s Gregor Samsa waking up after a restless night only to realise that he has been transformed into an insect.", "His writing comes out of the realistic nineteenth-century tradition, with innovators such as Jane Austen, Charles Dickens, Charlotte Brontë and George Eliot. This was when the novel opened its window onto the quotidian world. Ishiguro too is an innovator, always taking risks. With every new book he investigates a new genre-mix, with elements of the detective story, science fiction, myth … The window of the novel has always been wide. Ishiguro has widened it even more."

Nobel lecture
Kazuo Ishiguro's Nobel lecture My Twentieth Century Evening – and Other Small Breakthroughs was delivered at the Swedish Academy on 7 December 2017.

Gallery
 5 October 2017: Announcement of the 2017 Nobel laureate in Literature by Sara Danius, permanent secretary of the Swedish Academy.

 6 December 2017: Kazuo Ishiguro in Stockholm during the Swedish Academy's press conference.

References

External links
Prize announcement and interview about Ishiguro's work nobelprize.org
Award ceremony prize presentation nobelprize.org
Kazuo  Ishiguro Nobel lecture nobelprize.org

2017
2017 awards